Ost. 30 Hari Mencari Cinta is a music album from Sheila on 7. Released at 2003, it is the original soundtrack from the film 30 Hari Mencari Cinta featuring the hit singles "Melompat Lebih Tinggi" and "Berhenti Berharap".

Track listing 
 Melompat Lebih Tinggi 
 Berhenti Berharap 
 Kita (Acoustic)
 Berai (Remix)
 Mari Bercinta (Acoustic)
 Untuk Perempuan
 Tunjuk Satu Bintang (Remix)
 J.A.P
 Sebuah Kisah Klasik (Acoustic)
 Menyelamatkanmu

2003 albums
Sheila on 7 albums